Sagitovo (Säğit) is a rural locality (a village) in Baishevsky Selsoviet, Zianchurinsky District, Bashkortostan, Russia. The population was 243 as of 2010. There are 4 streets.

Geography 
Sagitovo is located 89 km southeast of Isyangulovo (the district's administrative centre) by road. Baishevo is the nearest rural locality.

References 

Rural localities in Zianchurinsky District